Merz Pharma GmbH & Co. KGaA is a privately-held pharmaceutical company based in Frankfurt, Germany with affiliates across Europe, as well as the US, Canada, Mexico, Brazil and Asia Pacific and regional headquarters in Singapore and North Carolina, USA.

The company is active in research, development and distribution of products in the areas of aesthetic medicine and neurologically induced movement disorders. In German-speaking countries, the Merz consumer products business, Merz Consumer Care, is a provider of health, wellness and beauty products with its tetesept and Merz Spezial brands.

Today, Merz’s global businesses are focused on the areas of medical aesthetics and neurotoxin therapy, supported by regional brands in both the prescription medicine and consumer health and beauty sectors. Key brands in the Merz Aesthetics portfolio include Belotero, Radiesse, Cellfina, Ultherapy, certain brands of Botulinum Toxin and Neocutis (US only).

History
The company was founded in 1908 in Frankfurt, Germany by a 24-year-old chemist named Friedrich Merz, and is still owned by the fourth generation of the Merz family.

1908 – Company founded

1911 – Introduction of first topical contraceptive Patentex

1953 – Launch of anti-wrinkle moisturizing cream Placentubex

1964 – Development of Merz Spezial Dragées from 18 different active ingredients

1965 – Introduction of tetesept bath medicine

1968 – Launch of Placentubex Foaming Mask

2002 – Introduction of Memantine for the treatment of Alzheimer’s disease

2005 – Merz launches a uniquely purified Botulinum Toxin

2010 – Acquisition of Bioform and its flagship product RADIESSE

2013 – Acquisition of Anteis and its range of dermal fillers, Belotero

2013 – Acquisition of Swiss skincare company Neocutis

2014 – Acquisition of the Ulthera System, the first ultrasound platform device with FDA clearance

2015 – Launch of Radiesse (+) Lidocaine in the US market

2015 – Establishment of Asia Pacific regional Headquarters in Singapore

2016 – Acquisition of ON Light Sciences with its flagship product DeScribe

2016 – Launch of the Cellfina System in the US, minimally-invasive cellulite treatment

2018 – Launch of Belotero Lips

2019 – Launch of Belotero Revive

2020 – Reorganization into three businesses: Merz Aesthetics, Merz Therapeutics, and Merz Consumer Care

References

External links 
 merz.com
https://merzaesthetics.com/

Manufacturing companies based in Frankfurt
Pharmaceutical companies of Germany
Pharmaceutical companies established in 1908
1908 establishments in Germany
Medical and health organisations based in Hesse